Lee Minkler was an American sound engineer. He was nominated for an Academy Award in the category Best Sound for the film Tron. His name was featured in the Oscars In Memoriam 2018.

Selected filmography
 Tron (1982)

References

External links
 

Year of birth missing
American audio engineers
Year of death missing